Dan Zoler (born January 10, 1974) is an Israeli chess Grandmaster (2011) and a medical doctor. His highest rating was 2558 (August 2012) when he ranked 12th in Israel.

He won the 1990 U20 Israeli championship. 

In 1992 in Duisburg he achieved a bronze medal at the junior U18 world championship.

In July 2010 Zoler won clear first place at the International Open in Andorra with 7.5/9.

In July 2012 he won clear first place at the 32nd International Open at Benasque in Spain scoring 9/10.

References

External links 

 
 Dan Zoler chess games at 365Chess.com

Chess grandmasters
Israeli chess players
Living people
1974 births